"Sssnakepit" is a single by English rock band Enter Shikari, the first from their third studio album "A Flash Flood of Colour". The single was released on 20 September 2011 as a digital download. The song charted at number 62 in the UK Singles Chart, number 11 on the UK Indie Chart and number 1 on the UK Rock Chart.

Music video
A music video (produced and directed by Kode Media) to accompany the release of "Sssnakepit" was first released onto YouTube on 14 September 2011, at a total length of three minutes.

Track listings
Digital download
 "Sssnakepit" – 3:28

iTunes Remix EP
 "Sssnakepit" - 3:28
 "Sssnakepit" (Rout remix) – 4:31
 "Sssnakepit" (Hamilton remix) – 4:51
 "Sssnakepit" (Serial Killaz remix) – 5:30

7" Vinyl Remix single
 "Sssnakepit" (Rout remix) – 4:31
 "Quelle Surprise" (Rout VIP Mix) – 5:19

Chart performance

Release history

References

2011 songs
2011 singles
Enter Shikari songs
Wikipedia requested audio of songs
Drum and bass songs
Industrial songs